Postgraduate Institute of Medical Education and Research Satellite Centre Sangrur (PGIMER Satellite Centre Sangrur) is a hospital based in Sangrur, Punjab, India.

History
In 2013, Health Minister Ghulam Nabi Azad laid foundation stone of 25 acres and 300-bed PGIMER Satellite Centre Sangrur in Ghabdan village of Sangrur district.

Facilities 
Inaugurated in 2016, OPD services are available from 9.00 am till 4.00 pm (Monday to Saturday) at PGIMER Satellite Centre Sangrur for OPD facilities in Internal Medicine, General Surgery, Obstetrics and gynaecology, Ophthalmology (Eye), ENT, Orthopedics, Dermatology and Dental. Medical Diagnostic facilities of X-ray and ECG and laboratory services in Biochemistry, Hematology and Microbiology are also available.

References

Hospitals in Punjab, India
Medical Council of India
Regional Cancer Centres in India
Hospitals established in 2016
2016 establishments in Punjab, India
Research institutes in Punjab, India